Levi Jose Romero (born April 12, 1984) is a Venezuelan former professional baseball pitcher. Romero played in the Houston Astros and Texas Rangers minor league systems from 2003 to 2008. He also played for the Yomiuri Giants and Fukuoka SoftBank Hawks in Nippon Professional Baseball from 2009 to 2012.

External links

NBP

1984 births
Living people
Venezuelan expatriate baseball players in Japan
Nippon Professional Baseball pitchers
Yomiuri Giants players
Fukuoka SoftBank Hawks players
Martinsville Astros players
Tri-City ValleyCats players
Lexington Legends players
Greeneville Astros players
Bakersfield Blaze players
Clinton LumberKings players